In mathematics, a Menger space is a topological space that satisfies a certain basic selection principle that generalizes σ-compactness.

History

In 1924, Karl Menger 
 
introduced the following basis property for metric spaces: 
Every basis of the topology contains a countable family of sets with vanishing 
diameters that covers the space. Soon thereafter, 
Witold Hurewicz  
observed that Menger's basis property can be reformulated to the above form using sequences of open covers.

Menger's conjecture

Menger conjectured that in ZFC every Menger metric space is σ-compact. 
A. W. Miller and D. H. Fremlin 
proved that Menger's conjecture is false, by showing that there is,
in ZFC, a set of real numbers that is Menger but not σ-compact. 
The Fremlin-Miller proof was dichotomic, and the set witnessing the failure
of the conjecture heavily depends on whether a certain (undecidable) axiom
holds or not.

Bartoszyński and Tsaban
 
gave a uniform ZFC example of a Menger subset of the real line that is not σ-compact.

Combinatorial characterization

For subsets of the real line, the Menger property can be characterized using continuous functions into the Baire space .
For functions , write  if  for all but finitely many natural numbers . Hurewicz proved that a subset of the real line is Menger iff every continuous image of that space into the Baire space is not dominating. In particular, every subset of the real line of cardinality less than the dominating number  is Menger.

The cardinality of Bartoszyński and Tsaban's counter-example to Menger's conjecture is
.

Properties

 Every compact, and even σ-compact, space is Menger.
 Every Menger space is a Lindelöf space
 Continuous image of a Menger space is Menger
 The Menger property is closed under taking  subsets
 Menger's property characterizes filters whose Mathias forcing notion does not add dominating functions.

References

Properties of topological spaces
Topology